Miguel Saavedra is a retired American soccer midfielder who played professionally in the USL A-League.

Saavedra, the son of Mexican immigrant parents, grew up in Milwaukee and attended Milwaukee Trade and Technical High School.  In January 2001, Saavedra signed with Major League Soccer as a Project 40 player.  In February 2001, the Dallas Burn selected Saavedra in the sixth round (66th overall) of the 2001 MLS SuperDraft. On May 25, 2001, Saavedra played one game on loan to the Atlanta Silverbacks of the USL A-League.  In June 2001, the Burn sent Saavedra on loan to the Nashville Metros for four games.  On January 15, 2002, the Chicago Fire acquired Saavedra and Aleksey Korol from the Burn for the Fire's 2002 sixth round draft pick.  Saavedra spent most of the 2002 season on loan to the Milwaukee Rampage, including the USL A-League championship game, won by Milwaukee.  Although Saavedra never played a league game with the Fire, in April 2002, he came on in the 78th minute for David Vaudreuil in a quarterfinal loss to Morelia in the 2002 CONCACAF Champions' Cup.  The Fire waived Saavedra on November 5, 2002.

Saavedra played several games for the United States men's national under-20 soccer team.

References

External links
 

Living people
1983 births
Soccer players from Milwaukee
American soccer players
Atlanta Silverbacks players
Chicago Fire FC players
FC Dallas players
Milwaukee Rampage players
Nashville Metros players
A-League (1995–2004) players
FC Dallas draft picks
United States men's under-20 international soccer players
Association football midfielders